Scharnweberstraße is a Berlin U-Bahn station located on the .
It was constructed by B. Grimmek in 1958. Due to the extension of the U6, the trains had to go above ground after Kurt-Schumacher-Platz station. Soil for the embankment on which the line is built came from excavations for the U9, which was being built in parallel.
As the trains had to go above ground, Berliner Verkehrsbetriebe (BVG), who operate the Berlin U-Bahn, had to install windscreen wipers on the trains.

References 

U6 (Berlin U-Bahn) stations
Buildings and structures in Reinickendorf
Railway stations in Germany opened in 1958